Ukrainian male artistic gymnasts have competed at every Olympic Games since 1996.  Prior to this they competed as part of the Soviet Union.

Gymnasts

Medalists

See also
 List of Olympic female artistic gymnasts for Ukraine

References

gymnasts
Ukraine